André Doré (born February 11, 1958) is a Canadian former professional ice hockey player who played 257 games in the National Hockey League with the New York Rangers, St. Louis Blues and Quebec Nordiques between 1979 and 1985.

Playing career
As a youth, he played in the 1971 Quebec International Pee-Wee Hockey Tournament with a minor ice hockey team from Pointe-Claire. He played junior hockey for the Hull Olympiques, Trois-Rivières Draveurs, and the Quebec Remparts from 1975 to 1978. The New York Rangers chose him 60th overall in the 1978 NHL Amateur Draft.

Doré spent four and a half years with the Rangers, splitting the seasons between the NHL team and the minor pros. In 1983 he was traded to the Blues for Vaclav Nedomansky and Glen Hanlon. The following season he was sent to the Quebec Nordiques in exchange for Dave Pichette. The Rangers claimed him back in the 1984-85 season and he retired in 1986.

Career statistics

Regular season and playoffs

References

External links
 

1958 births
Living people
Canadian ice hockey defencemen
French Quebecers
Hershey Bears players
Hull Festivals players
Hull Olympiques players
Ice hockey people from Montreal
New Haven Nighthawks players
New York Rangers draft picks
New York Rangers players
Quebec Nordiques players
Quebec Remparts players
St. Louis Blues players
Springfield Indians players
Trois-Rivières Draveurs players